Fedia graciliflora is a species of plants in the family Caprifoliaceae.

Sources

References 

graciliflora
Flora of Malta